Anjum Aqeel Khan is a Pakistani politician who had been a member of the National Assembly of Pakistan from 2008 to 2013.

Early life
Khan started his career as a school teacher. He then became a real estate agent, and later a real estate developer.

Political career

He was elected to the National Assembly of Pakistan from Constituency NA-48 (Islamabad-I) as a candidate of Pakistan Muslim League (N) (PML-N) in 2008 Pakistani general election. He received 61,480 votes and defeated  Syed Israr Hussain, a candidate of Pakistan Peoples Party (PPP).

He ran for the seat of the National Assembly from Constituency NA-48 (Islamabad-I) as a candidate of PML-N in 2013 Pakistani general election but was unsuccessful. He received 52,205 votes and lost the seat to Javed Hashmi.

Controversies
In February 2011, Khan agreed to reimburse the sum of 5.8 billion rupees after admitting to the Federal Investigation Agency that, as the real estate broker of the National Police Foundation, he caused major financial losses (six-billion-rupee land fraud) to the Foundation. He was arrested in July 2011, but got released shortly thereafter. In November 2011, the police prosecuted Khan again for illegally occupying a plot in Islamabad. Arrested, he finally was bailed out in March 2012.

In 2016, the Pakistani National Accountability Bureau is criticized for not moving forward on Khan's obvious illegal real estate operations. In 2019, Khan is acquitted in National Police Foundation corruption case.

References

Living people
Pakistani MNAs 2008–2013
People from Islamabad
Pakistani prisoners and detainees
Pakistani politicians convicted of crimes
Year of birth missing (living people)